El Manso Airport is a public use airport located near Llanada Grande, Los Lagos, Chile.

See also
Talk:El Manso Airport
List of airports in Chile

References

External links 
 Airport record for El Manso Airport at Landings.com

Airports in Los Lagos Region